The 1976 Benson & Hedges Cup was the fifth edition of cricket's Benson & Hedges Cup. The competition was won by Kent County Cricket Club.	Compared with the previous year, the groups were no longer organised on a regional basis, and the minor counties were divided east–west rather than north–south.

Fixtures and results

Group stage

Group A

Group B

Group C

Group D

Quarter-finals

Semi-finals

Final

References
Benson and Hedges Cup 1976
												

Benson & Hedges Cup seasons
1976 in English cricket